Noel Harvey Hilliard (6 February 1929 – 22 October 1996) was a New Zealand journalist and novelist.

Background
Hilliard was born in 1929 in Napier, New Zealand. He married Kiriwai Mete in 1954 and they were to have two sons and two daughters. Hilliard gained his education at Kotemaori Primary School, Raupunga Maori School, Kopuawhara Primary School, and Gisborne High School. He attended Victoria University College and Wellington Teachers' College; he gained a teacher's certificate in 1955.

In 1971, Hilliard was the recipient of the Robert Burns Fellowship.

Hilliard's wife died in 1990; at the time they were living at Titahi Bay in Wellington. His death was announced in the December 1996 edition of Booksellers News.

Works

Fiction
 Māori Girl (Heinemann, 1960)
 A Piece of Land: Stories and Sketches (Robert Hale, 1963)
 Power of Joy (Michael Joseph, 1965)
 A Night at Green River (Whitcombe and Tombs,1969)
 Māori Woman (Whitcombe and Tombs, 1974)
 Send Somebody Nice (Robert Hale, 1976)
 Selected Stories (John McIndoe, 1977)
 The Glory and the Dream (Heinemann, 1978)

Non-Fiction
 We Live by a Lake (with Ans Westra; Heinemann, 1972)
 Wellington: City Alive (with Ans Westra; Whitcoulls, 1976)
 Mahitahi: Work Together: Impressions of the USSR (Progress Publishers, 1989)
 Nude Chooks Stun Farmer! (with Bill Paynter; Reed, 1992)

References

1929 births
1996 deaths
20th-century New Zealand male writers
People from Napier, New Zealand
People from Wellington City
People educated at Gisborne Boys' High School
Victoria University of Wellington alumni